Aage Ernst Larsen (3 August 1923 – 31 October 2016) was a Danish rower who specialized in the double scull event. Together with Ebbe Parsner he won the European titles in 1949 and 1950 and a silver medal at the 1948 Olympics. At the 1952 Games they were eliminated in the first round.

References

External links 
 

1923 births
2016 deaths
Danish male rowers
Olympic rowers of Denmark
Rowers at the 1948 Summer Olympics
Rowers at the 1952 Summer Olympics
Olympic silver medalists for Denmark
Olympic medalists in rowing
Medalists at the 1948 Summer Olympics
European Rowing Championships medalists